Haitham bin Tariq Al Said  (born 11 October 1955) is the current Sultan of Oman, reigning since January 2020 following the death of his cousin, Sultan Qaboos bin Said.

Prior to becoming sultan, Haitham served for multiple decades in the cabinet of Sultan Qaboos bin Said, his cousin. He was Minister of Heritage and Culture from 2002 to 2020. Sultan Qaboos named Haitham as his successor in his will, and he was proclaimed sultan on 11 January 2020, hours after Qaboos's death.

Biography
Haitham bin Tariq is a son of Sayyid Tariq bin Taimur, son of Sultan Taimur bin Feisal. Haitham has six brothers and two half-sisters (Amal and Nawwal who is the former wife of Sultan Qaboos). His brother Asa'ad bin Tariq is the Deputy Prime Minister for relations and international cooperation affairs and his brother Shihab bin Tariq is the Deputy Prime Minister for Defense Affairs (and the father of his daughter-in-law, Meyyan). His other brothers, Talal, Qais, Adham, and Faris, are all businessmen and are not involved in politics. He has four children, two sons and two daughters. His eldest son, Theyazin bin Haitham, is the crown prince of Oman.

Haitham is described by The Economist as "outward-looking and Western-oriented". He attended Pembroke College, University of Oxford, graduating from the Foreign Service Programme (FSP) in 1979.

Political career
A sports enthusiast, Haitham served as the first head of the Oman Football Association in the early 1980s. He served as the Undersecretary of the Ministry of Foreign Affairs for Political Affairs from 1986 to 1994, and was later appointed as the Secretary General for the Ministry of Foreign Affairs (1994–2002). He was later appointed as Minister of Heritage and Culture in March 2002 and later chaired the national census committee in 2003. He usually represented Oman abroad in a diplomatic capacity; in 2016, he personally welcomed Charles, Prince of Wales, and his wife Camilla, Duchess of Cornwall, on a visit to Oman.

Haitham is also chairman of the committee for the future vision of "Oman 2040" along with being honorary president of the Oman Association for the Disabled. His record in government under Sultan Qaboos bin Said has been described by The Economist as poor.

Sultan of Oman

After the death of Sultan Qaboos, Haitham's first cousin, on 10 January 2020, Haitham was named by the royal family and Qaboos's will as Sultan of Oman the next day and took an oath before an emergency session of the Council of Oman in Al-Bustan. Oman state TV said the former sultan's letter was opened by the Defence Council and his identity was announced shortly thereafter. As sultan, he also held the positions of prime minister, supreme commander of the armed forces, minister of defence, minister of finance, and minister of foreign affairs until 18 August 2020 when he appointed Sayyid Badr bin Hamad bin Hamood Al Busaidi as foreign minister and Sultan bin Salem bin Saeed al-Habsi as minister of finance. In his first public speech, he promised to uphold his predecessor's peace-making foreign policy and to further develop Oman's economy. Haitham bin Tariq is married and, unlike his predecessor, also has children, two sons and two daughters.

On 12 January 2021, the Sultan issued a royal decree appointing his eldest son, Sayyid Theyazin, as the country's first crown prince. He also changed the Basic Law of Oman to grant citizens and residents freedom of expression and opinion, removed a law that allowed the state to monitor private phone conversations, social media or postal correspondence, and granted the freedom to practice religious rites according to recognized customs provided it does not violate the public order or contradict morals.

In May and June 2021, there were many protests against the Omani government over economic concerns such as unemployment and corruption. Some protesters were arrested and then released.

Haitham's visits to Saudi Arabia, Qatar and the United Kingdom have been seen as a move to maintain peaceful and cordial relations with Oman's important partners. His visit to Saudi Arabia was the first political visit by an Omani royal to the kingdom in over a decade. During his visit to the United Kingdom, he met Queen Elizabeth II at Windsor Castle and was honoured with a GCMG. On 19 September 2022, Haitham attended the state funeral of Elizabeth II at Westminster Abbey, London.

Honours 

: Member Exceptional Class of the Order of Sheikh Isa bin Salman Al Khalifa (24 October 2022).
 : Grand Cordon of the Supreme Order of the Renaissance (4 October 2022).
 : Sword of the Founder Sheikh Jassim bin Mohammed bin Thani (22 November 2021).
 : Collar of the Order of Abdulaziz al Saud (11 July 2021 – I Class, 24 December 2006).
 : Collar of the Order of Zayed (27 September 2022).
 :
 Honorary Knight Grand Cross of the Royal Victorian Order (GCVO) (26 November 2010).
 Honorary Knight Grand Cross of the Order of St Michael and St George (GCMG) (15 December 2021).

References 

1955 births
Living people
Omani Ibadi Muslims
People from Muscat, Oman
Sultans of Oman
Haitham bin Tariq
Culture ministers of Oman
Honorary Knights Grand Cross of the Royal Victorian Order
Honorary Knights Grand Cross of the Order of St Michael and St George
Recipients of the Grand Decoration for Services to the Republic of Austria
Alumni of Pembroke College, Oxford
20th-century Omani people